Animal Politics EU, formerly Euro Animal 7, is a group of animal rights parties in European Union countries.

Goals

Group members call for:

 Raise the moral and legal status of animals
 Improve the welfare of animals kept for farming purposes and ensure proper enforcement of animal welfare legislation across all EU member states
 Phase out farming practices which are harmful to animals and re-direct EU subsidies away from the intensive livestock industry, into sustainable, plant-based and organic agriculture
 End the long-distance transport of live animals within and outside the EU
 Stop overfishing within and outside European waters
 Phase out animal testing with binding targets for reduction and replacement, combined with incentives for alternative testing methods
 End legal derogations and subsidies for so-called cultural and religious traditions that involve cruelty to animals, such as bullfighting, non-stun slaughter and foie gras production
 Fight the illicit trade of pets in the EU and halt the barbaric treatment of stray dogs and cats in Europe
 Implement a ban on hunting and prohibit the import of wildlife trophies
 Close all fur farms in Europe and ban fur imports from third countries
 Take hazardous pesticides and endocrine disrupting chemicals out of the market
 Combat climate change by supporting a shift towards a plant-based lifestyle
Implementing a CO2 tax for companies and speeding up efforts to realise a complete switch to renewable energy
 Realise efficient, affordable and accessible public transport, as an alternative to air travel

Member parties

‡ Founding parties of EuroAnimal 7. The Animal Welfare Party of the United Kingdom was also a founding party, but as a result of Brexit, no longer participates in EU electoral alliances.

Notes 
 PAN's only MEP resigned from the party in June 2020 and remained in the GUE/NGL parliamentary group as an independent MEP.

References

Political parties established in 2014
Animal advocacy parties
Pan-European political parties